David Yedija Pohan (born 8 September 1978) is an Indonesian male badminton player. He has won several tournaments including Bahrain Satellite (2007) in the mixed doubles event, and USA International (2016) in the men's and mixed doubles event. In 2017, he was selected as men's doubles coach at the Indonesia national badminton team.

Achievements

BWF International Challenge/Series (3 titles) 
Men's Doubles

Mixed Doubles

 BWF International Challenge tournament
 BWF International Series tournament

References

External links 
 

1978 births
Living people
Sportspeople from North Kalimantan
People from Tarakan
Indonesian male badminton players
Badminton coaches
People of Batak descent